Damascus is an unincorporated community in Gordon County, Georgia, United States. Damascus is located at the intersection of I-75/SR 401 and US 41/SR 3 north of Calhoun.

It was named after the ancient city of Damascus.

References

Unincorporated communities in Gordon County, Georgia
Unincorporated communities in Georgia (U.S. state)